Débora Susan Sanches Duke (born January 2, 1950) best known as Débora Duarte, is a Brazilian actress.

Early life 
Débora was born in São Paulo, Brazil. She is the daughter of actress Marisa Sanches with the American musician, Douglas Duke. When she was a year and eight months, her mother married the Brazilian actor Lima Duarte, who became her father. In order to honor him, Deborah adopted his artistic surname.

At the age of five, Duarte got her first role, on the TV Tupi series Ciranda, cirandinha.

Her biography, Débora Duarte: Filha da Televisão (Coleção Aplauso Perfil) by writer Laura Malin, was published in 2009.

Personal life
She has been married twice, first to actor Wladimir Nikolaief, and, secondly to singer Antônio Marcos (died 6 April 1992). She has two daughters, Daniela and Paloma, both also actresses.

Filmography

Television
 2012 - Lado a Lado .... Eulália Praxedes
 2011 - Cordel Encantado .... Dona Amália
 2010 - Tempos Modernos .... Tertuliana
 2009 - Toma Lá, Dá Cá ....... Moacira
 2008 - Três Irmãs .... Florinda
 2007 - Paraíso Tropical .... Hermínia
 2004 - Como uma Onda .... Alice Prata
 2003 - Canavial de Paixões .... Teresa Giácomo (SBT)
 2002 - O Quinto dos Infernos .... Amália (minissérie)
 2001 - Porto dos Milagres .... Olímpia
 1999 - Terra Nostra .... Maria do Socorro
 1998 - Hilda Furacão .... Tia Sãozinha (minissérie)
 1995 - Explode Coração .... Marisa
 1994 - Pátria Minha .... Carmita Bevilácqua
 1993 - Sonho Meu .... Mariana
 1991 - Grande pai .... Maria
 1989 - Cortina de vidro .... Giovana (SBT)
 1988 - Bebê a Bordo .... Joana Mendonça
 1987 - A rainha da vida .... Estela (minissérie - Rede Manchete)
 1984 - Corpo a Corpo .... Eloá Pelegrini
 1984 - Partido Alto .... Laura
 1984 - Padre Cícero .... Maria de Araújo (minissérie)
 1984 - Anarquistas graças a Deus .... Angelina Gattai (minissérie)
 1983 - Parabéns pra você .... Maria Rita (minissérie)
 1982 - Elas por Elas .... Rosa
 1981 - Jogo da vida .... Beatriz Madureira
 1980 - Coração Alado .... Catucha
 1979 - Cara a cara .... Regina
 1977 - O profeta .... Carola
 1975 - Pecado Capital .... Vilminha Lisboa
 1975 - Escalada
 1974 - O espigão .... Dora
 1973 - Carinhoso .... Marisa
 1972 - A patota .... Nely
 1971 - Bicho do mato .... Ruth
 1971 - Editora Mayo, bom dia .... Jô
 1970 - Toninho on the Rocks .... Anita
 1970 - As bruxas .... Stella
 1969 - Beto Rockfeller .... Lu
 1968 - O homem que sonhava colorido
 1968 - O décimo mandamento .... Mariana
 1967 - O grande segredo .... Nina
 1967 - O morro dos ventos uivantes .... young Catarina
 1966 - Ninguém crê em mim .... Martinha
 1965 - Ana Maria, meu amor
 1965 - O pecado de cada um .... Mônica
 1965 - A outra .... Carina
 1964 - Gutierritos, o drama dos humildes
 1964 - Quem casa com Maria? .... Maria das Graças
 1958 - Os miseráveis .... Cosette

Film
 1987 - A menina do lado
 1974 - Pontal da solidão
 1970 - Celeste
 1970 - Pais quadrados... filhos avançados

References

External links

Living people
1950 births
Actresses from São Paulo
Brazilian people of American descent
Brazilian people of Spanish descent
Brazilian film actresses
Brazilian telenovela actresses
20th-century Brazilian actresses
21st-century Brazilian actresses